Brotis is a genus of moths of the family Noctuidae.

External links
Natural History Museum Lepidoptera genus database

Noctuinae